Tom and Jerry: The Magic Ring is a 2002 American animated fantasy comedy film. Produced by Warner Bros. Animation (making it the first Tom and Jerry production to be made by that company, as parent company Time Warner, had purchased franchise then-owner Turner Broadcasting System in 1996) and Turner Entertainment Co., it was the first made-for-video attempt to recapture the style of William Hanna and Joseph Barbera's original film shorts from Metro-Goldwyn-Mayer as well as the final animated collaboration of both Hanna and Barbera, as Hanna died on March 22, 2001.

The film was originally set for a 2001 release, but was instead released on March 12, 2002 on both VHS and DVD (nearly one year after Hanna's death) due to a preview of the film found on some Warner Home Video DVDs, including the DVD releases of the Scooby-Doo television specials and direct-to-video films. A Game Boy Advance video game based on the film was also made.

Plot 

Inside a haunted and creepy mansion, an greedy adult cat named Tom chases a beautiful young childlike mouse named Jerry while breaking things in the process. Meanwhile in the basement, Tom's owner (a wizard named Chip) attempts to make a potion using his magic ring, but uses the wrong kind of milk for the concoction. Chip throws Tom into the basement and orders him to guard the ring while he travels to Calcutta to get the correct milk. If Tom does a good job, he'll be rewarded with a juicy salmon but if not he will be thrown out on the street. Unknown to Tom, Jerry finds the ring while climbing the table and puts it on his head, wearing it like a crown. Jerry runs out of the mansion and Tom follows, attempting to find him so he can get the ring back.

Jerry tries to get the ring removed by going to a jewelry store. However, the owner has left for lunch and Tom sneaks in and disguises himself as the owner and helps Jerry get the ring off, but to no avail. Afterwards, Jerry goes into a house and runs into Butch and Droopy (who is a psychic). Butch attempts to get the ring of Jerry's head, but also fails. Tom comes in and Jerry runs out with Butch chasing after him as well. They end up in an alley where an alley cat is taking a nap. He wakes up and tries to eat Jerry, but Tom rescues him by using the magic powers of the ring. Butch arrives and finally gets the ring off Jerry's head. Tom and the alley cat then chase Butch and the ring gets stuck back on Jerry again. When Tom is running away from Butch and the alley cat, he slips on a banana peel and ends up unconscious outside a pet store.

A kind old lady comes out and takes them both inside the store which is filled with animals from all over the world. She puts them in two cages, however Tom is paired with Spike and his son Tyke, while Jerry is left with two mice named Freddie and Joey, who bully a young nappy-wearing mouse named Nibbles. Jerry uses the ring to stop the mouse bullies from hurting Nibbles, by turning them into chunks of cheese. When the cheese mice escape the cage, Jerry uses the ring to make Nibbles grow into a giant mouse who breaks free and chases the cheese mice from the store. A boy comes and buys Jerry, but the ring produces magic, melting Tom and allowing him to escape his cage. Tom sneaks outside and snatches Jerry from the boy's hand, whose Mother tells a police officer. The alley cat and Butch, together with Spike and Tyke, also chase Tom, who escapes with Jerry by riding a bus driven by Droopy. Eventually the duo end up cornered in a garbage dump, where Jerry uses the magic ring to freeze the dogs, alley cat and military police cars. Now safe, Tom and Jerry head back to the mansion where Tom once again tries to get the ring off. Jerry hides in a kitchen cupboard and uses furniture ring remover to get the ring off before throwing it down into the basement. Tom retrieves the ring, but to his horror it gets stuck on his finger.

Hearing Chip returning home, Tom tries to get the ring off. Thinking that Tom stole his ring, Chip angrily kicks him out of the mansion, causing the ring to fall off Tom's finger. This unfreezes the various cats, dogs and military police from earlier, who all chase Tom into the sunset.

At the conclusion, Jerry receives the salmon reward from Chip which he turns into cheese using the ring.

Cast 
 Jeff Glen Bennett as Tom Cat, Droopy Dog, Joey
 Frank Welker as Jerry Mouse, Tyke
 Charlie Schlatter as Chip 
 Jim Cummings as Butch
 Maile Flanagan as Boy
 Jess Harnell as Police Officer
 Maurice LaMarche as Spike Bulldog, Butch Cat (credited as "Alleycat")
 Tress MacNeille as Margaret, Mom
 Tara Strong as Nibbles Mouse
 Billy West as Freddie

Reception 
Carrie R. Wheadon of Common Sense Media gave a negative review saying "There's very little magic here at all and very little story that makes sense or fits together." Christopher Simons of DVD Talk was slightly more positive stating "I'd say pick it up, but only for the younger ones."

Follow-up film 
Tom and Jerry: Blast Off to Mars was released on January 18, 2005.

References

External links 
 

2001 films
2001 animated films
2001 direct-to-video films
2000s fantasy comedy films
2000s children's comedy films
2000s American animated films
2000s children's animated films
American direct-to-video films
American fantasy comedy films
American slapstick comedy films
American children's animated comedy films
American children's animated fantasy films
Animated films about dogs
Animated films about magic
Films set in 2001
Films set in the United States
Films about wizards
Magic realism films
Tom and Jerry films
Warner Bros. Animation animated films
Warner Bros. direct-to-video animated films
2001 comedy films
Droopy
2000s English-language films